Warren W. Smith was an American football player and coach.  He served as the head football coach at the University of Oregon in 1901 and 1903, compiling a record of 7–6–2.  Smith played college football at the University of California, Berkeley as a halfback football from 1898 to 1900.

Head coaching record

References

Year of birth missing
Year of death missing
19th-century players of American football
American football halfbacks
California Golden Bears football players
Oregon Ducks football coaches